Ludwig Carl Friedrich (Louis) Graeser (12 February 1840, in Dresden –  9 December 1913, in Hamburg) was a German entomologist who specialised in Palearctic Lepidoptera. He was a bookbinder.

His collections are in the Zoological Museum of the Zoological Institute of the Russian Academy of Sciences (Amur, Siberia) and Zoologisches Museum Hamburg (West Palearctic)

Works
1888-9 Beiträge zur Kenntnis der Lepidopteren-Fauna des Amurlandes Berl. Ent. Zs. 32 (1): 33–153 (1888), (2): 309–414 (1889)

References
Novomodnyj, E. V. 2003, Puteschestvije L. Grezera [= Graeser] (1881-1885gg.) i ego znatschenije dlja issledovanija tscheschujekrylych (Lepidoptera, Insecta) Dal'nego Vostoka. Tschtenija pamjati Alekseja Ivanovitscha Kurencova = A. I. Kurentsov's Annual Memoiral Meetings, Vladivostok 13, S. 5–30.

German lepidopterists
1913 deaths
1840 births
19th-century German zoologists
20th-century German zoologists
Bookbinders
Scientists from Dresden